Tomás Francisco Ross  (March 1, 1999, Buenos Aires)  is an Argentine actor and Youtuber. He is best known for his role on the Cris Morena television series Casi Ángeles playing Cristobal Bauer.

Recent years 
Currently, he has a fun YouTube channel, in which he shares his funny sense of humor and which today, has the support of 200 thousand people.

In 2019, he was part of the cast of Sintonía Pop, an infantile-youth musical, along with great artists such as Belén Pouchan, Paula Amoedo and Bianca Dipasquale.
Tomás played the role of Franco, a very funny boy and the gallant of Sintonía Pop, the musical school of which it is a part.

Career 
Tomás, who also spends a lot of time communicating with his followers on his personal Instagram, began his television career working on Alma Pirata (2006), playing Nicolás Vázquez in his childhood, with whom he later returned to work in Casi Angeles (2007-2008), carrying out the role of Cristobal, Nicolás' little son, and also formed part of 51 functions in the Teatro Gran Rex with the cast in 2007.
Then, he continued working for Ideas del Sur in Consentidos (2009-2010), taking the role of Benjamín, a very flirtatious boy and the small gallant of his school. In 2011, he made an appearance on Peter Punk, a program broadcast on Disney XD.
Tomás acted in multiple TV programs broadcast on Tv Pública, such as "La Viuda De Rafael" (2012), "C.A.P.O.S" (2012-2013) and "El Mal Menor" (2015-2016).

In recent years, Tomás has focused on theater, starting with Mauo, un amigo espacial (2018), a children's musical in which he played Ramiro, the evil antagonist of the school, doing 16 shows at the Ludé theater in winter season. In addition, she composed the role of a transgender girl, showing the social problems that this entails and the rejection she faces, in "Barrica" (2018), a musical focused on the teenage audience, performed at the Freire Cultural Center.
Recently, he was part of the advertising campaign PEGAMENTE, by Voligoma (brand)

Its beginnings 
Before taking his step on TV, Tomás advertised for national and international brands, such as Celusal, Danonino, Cif, and in other countries; Germany ( Knorr), France, Czech Republic and Canada, among others.

External links 
 Canal de Youtube de Tomás
 Sintonía Pop en Revista Pronto
 Instagram personal de Tomás
 Mauo, el musical en Revista Pronto

Male actors from Buenos Aires
Living people
1999 births